N. maritimus may refer to:
 Nicrophorus maritimus, a synonym for Nicrophorus investigator, a burying beetle
 Nitrosopumilus maritimus, an extremely common archaeon species living in seawater

See also
 Maritimus (disambiguation)